Oktafianus Fernando (born on 4 October 1993), is an Indonesian professional footballer who plays as a winger for Liga 1 club PSIS Semarang. He is the older brother of Marselino Ferdinan.

Career statistics

Club

Honours

Club 
Persebaya Surabaya
 Liga 2: 2017
 Liga 1 runner-up: 2019
 Indonesia President's Cup runner-up: 2019
 East Java Governor Cup: 2020

References

External links
 Oktafianus Fernando at Soccerway

1993 births
Living people
Indonesian footballers
Sportspeople from Jakarta
Persita Tangerang players
Persebaya Surabaya players
PSIS Semarang players
Liga 2 (Indonesia) players
Liga 1 (Indonesia) players
Association football wingers